The 2004–05 season was the 36th season of competitive association football in Australia. After the National Soccer League folded, there was no men's national league competition for the 2004–05 season and was soon to be replaced by the A-League for the 2005–06 season.

National teams

Australia national soccer team

Results

Friendlies

2004 OFC Nations Cup / 2006 FIFA World Cup qualification

Australia national under-20 soccer team

Women's football

Women's National Soccer League

References

External links
 Football Australia official website

2004 in Australian soccer
Seasons in Australian soccer